José María Angresola Jiménez (born 24 January 1989), commonly known as Mossa, is a Spanish retired footballer who played as a left-back, and is the current assistant manager of SD Huesca.

Club career
Born in Valencia, Valencian Community, Mossa graduated from local Levante UD's youth system, and made his senior debuts with the reserves in the 2007–08 campaign, in the Segunda División B. On 6 December 2008, he played his first match as a professional, coming on as a late substitute in a 3–1 home win against Albacete Balompié in the Segunda División.

On 20 June of the following year Mossa was handed his first start, playing the full 90 minutes in a 2–2 home draw against UD Las Palmas. He continued to appear regularly with the B-side in the Tercera División, however.

On 5 July 2011, Mossa signed a two-year deal with another reserve team, Valencia CF Mestalla. A year later, however, he returned to his previous club's B-side, now back to the third level.

On 7 July 2014, Mossa joined Gimnàstic de Tarragona, in the same division. He appeared in 37 matches during the season, as his club returned to the second level after a three-year absence.

On 31 July 2017, after becoming an undisputed starter for Nàstic, Mossa signed a two-year contract with fellow second-tier club Real Oviedo. On 4 July 2022, he retired at the age of 33 after his contract expired, and became an assistant of José Ángel Ziganda at SD Huesca.

References

External links
Levante official profile 

1989 births
Living people
Spanish footballers
Footballers from Valencia (city)
Association football defenders
Segunda División players
Segunda División B players
Tercera División players
Atlético Levante UD players
Levante UD footballers
Valencia CF Mestalla footballers
Gimnàstic de Tarragona footballers
Real Oviedo players